Keri Healey is an American playwright and voice actress, who has appeared in seven Nancy Drew games developed by Her Interactive.

Game appearances

External links

 http://www.playbill.com/news/article/emerging-playwright-keri-healey-wins-2012-m.-elizabeth-osborn-new-play-awar-203575

Living people
Year of birth missing (living people)
American voice actresses
21st-century American women